The 2020 IFSC Climbing European Championships, the 13th edition, were held in Moscow, Russia from 20 to 28 November 2020. The championships consisted of lead, speed, bouldering, and combined events. The winners of the last event will automatically qualify for the 2020 Summer Olympics in Tokyo, Japan, where climbing will make its debut.

Medals

Schedule

A total of 16 Medal events were held across four disciplines.

Qualification for the 2020 Summer Olympics

The best climber of the combined event automatically qualifies for the 2020 Summer Olympics, where sport climbing will make its debut.

The qualifiers for the 2020 Summer Olympics from the 2020 Championships Combined events are:

Bouldering

Women

Men

Lead

Women

Men

Speed

Women
Score Included are climbers who reached at least the quarterfinals. Yulia Kaplina set a new World Record in women's speed climbing (6.964).

Men
Score Included are climbers who reached at least the quarterfinals.

Combined

In combined competition, scoring is based on a multiplication formula, with points awarded by calculating the product of the three finishing ranks achieved in each discipline within the combined event. A competitor finishing with a first, a second and a sixth would thus be awarded 1 x 2 x 6 = 12 points, with the lowest scoring competitor winning.

Women

Men

See also
 IFSC Paraclimbing World Championships
 Sport climbing at the 2020 Summer Olympics
 2021 IFSC Climbing World Championships

References

External links 
 Official website
 IFSC Youtube Channel with live streams of the events

IFSC Climbing European Championships
European Climbing Championships
IFSC
IFSC